Brad Laird is an American football coach who is currently the head football coach at Northwestern State University. He previously served as an assistant football coach at Northwestern State, an assistant football coach at Stephen F. Austin State University, and various coaching positions at several high schools.  Laird played college football at Northwestern State University, where he played quarterback. Laird was named head football coach at Northwestern State University on November 20, 2017.

Head coaching record

College

References

External links
 Northwestern State profile

Year of birth missing (living people)
Living people
American football quarterbacks
Northwestern State Demons football coaches
Northwestern State Demons football players
Stephen F. Austin Lumberjacks football coaches
High school football coaches in Arkansas
High school football coaches in Louisiana
High school football coaches in Texas